Alain Haché (born 1970) is an experimental physicist, a professor at the University of Moncton, Canada. From 2003 to 2013 he held the Canada Research Chair in photonics. He is also the author of The Physics of Hockey  and Slap Shot Science, two popular science books on ice hockey.

Haché was born in Tracadie, New Brunswick in 1970. In 2002, he and undergraduate student Louis Poirier transmitted faster-than-light electrical pulses through a 120-metre long "photonic crystal" made of coaxial cables of alternating characteristic impedance (12 pairs of 50 Ω and 75 Ω cables). The experiment showed that the pulse envelope was recreated at the end of the cables at a speed of >3 c. This speed represents the group velocity, but the amplitude of the signal also drops in such a way that the energy transmitted never exceeds, at any given time, the energy that would have been transmitted by same pulse travelling in a vacuum.

References

Further reading

External links 
 Alain Haché's webpage @ Université de Moncton
 Alain Haché's scientific contributions @ Google Docs

Canadian physicists
1970 births
Living people
Canada Research Chairs
Academic staff of the Université de Moncton